Hans Gildemeister was the defending champion, but did not compete this year.

Pablo Arraya won the title by defeating Juan Aguilera 7–5, 7–5 in the final.

Seeds

Draw

Finals

Top half

Bottom half

References

External links
 Official results archive (ATP)
 Official results archive (ITF)

1983 Grand Prix (tennis)
ATP Bordeaux